Lisa Fuson (born October 25, 1963, in Los Angeles) is a voice actress who has played several roles in Star Wars video games.

Her roles were mainly Princess Leia and Vana Sage, but she also acted in the Nickelodeon cartoon series, Hey Arnold!, in several minor roles.

In 2018, Fuson voiced Barbie's mom, Margaret, on the series Barbie Dreamhouse Adventures, and Barbie: It Takes Two. Outside of voice acting, Lisa Fuson has acted on L.A. Vice.

Filmography

External links

American voice actresses
1963 births
Living people
American video game actresses
Actresses from Los Angeles
21st-century American women